Wanneperveen is a village in the Dutch province of Overijssel. It is located in the municipality of Steenwijkerland, about 4 km west of Meppel.

Wanneperveen was a separate municipality until 1973, when it became a part of Brederwiede. In 2001 Brederwiede was merged with nearby Steenwijk to form Steenwijkerland

Wanneperveen and the land around it sit right on the edge of Overijssel in a small pocket of land and, as such, are no more than fifteen kilometres from the borders of Friesland, Drenthe and Flevoland.

Economy 
The village has not much economic activities. Originally it was a peat harvesting area, which caused the area to form as it is with the many canals and lakes. In the 20th century it was mainly agricultural with the farms located along the main road through the village and the fields behind it. Only a few active farms remain. At present the main local "industry" is tourism. Many tourists come to the area, which includes the "Venice of the North" Giethoorn and the lakes like the Beulake- and Belterwijde. Wanneperveen offers a number of campings and marinas.

In the winter, if the ice on the canals and lakes permits ice skating the area attracts skaters from all the country. The village has an active ice-club. The club has a natural ice ice rink and they organize long distance tours when possible.

Notable people
 Albertus van Raalte, one of the main founders of Hope College in Holland, Michigan, United States.
 Angelique Hoorn - Dutch showjumper

References

Populated places in Overijssel
Former municipalities of Overijssel
Steenwijkerland